Star Mountains Rural LLG is a local-level government situated in the Star Mountains in North Fly District of Western Province of Papua New Guinea. In the year 2000, the LLG had 1691 homes, and a population of 12,114 people. (6776 men and 5338 women) The current population is more likely to now be around 15,000 people. The main population centre in the LLG is Tabubil. Finalbin and the Ok Tedi Mine are also in this LLG.

Neighboring Pegunungan Bintang Regency (meaning 'Star Mountains' in Indonesian) in Indonesia is also similarly named.

Wards
01. Atemkit
02. Kavorabip
03. Bultem
04. Finalbin
05. Wangbin
06. Migalsimbip
07. Niosikwi
08. Ok Tedi Tau
09. Kumkit
10. Ankits
11. Kawemtigin
12. Korokit
82. Tabubil Town

References

Local-level governments of Western Province (Papua New Guinea)